The General System has been described in [Zeigler76] and [ZPK00] with the standpoints to define (1) the time base, (2) the admissible input segments, (3) the system states, (4) the state trajectory with an admissible input segment, (5) the output for a given state.

A Timed Event System defining the state trajectory associated with the current and event segments came from the class of General System to allows non-deterministic behaviors in it [Hwang2012]. Since the behaviors of DEVS can be described by Timed Event System, DEVS and RTDEVS is a sub-class or an equivalent class of Timed Event System.

Timed Event Systems 
A timed event system is a structure
 
where
  is the set of events;
  is the set of states;
  is the set of initial states;
  is the set of accepting states;
  is the set of state trajectories in which  indicates that a state  can change into  along with an event segment . Two contiguous state trajectories  and  implies .

Behaviors and Languages of Timed Event System 
Given a timed event system , the set of its behaviors is called its language depending on the
observation time length. Let  be the observation time length.
If , -length observation language of
 

By sending the observation time length  to infinity, we define infinite length observation language of 
 

See also 
State Transition System

References 
 [Zeigler76] 
 [ZKP00] 
 [Hwang2012] 

Automata (computation)
Formal specification languages